Khairil Anwar (born 21 August 1997) is an Indonesian professional footballer who plays as a defensive midfielder for Liga 2 club Deltras.

Club career

Persiraja Banda Aceh
He was signed for Persiraja Banda Aceh to play in the Liga 1 in the 2021 season. Anwar made his league debut on 16 January 2022 in a match against Persipura Jayapura at the Kompyang Sujana Stadium, Denpasar.

Career statistics

Club

Notes

References

External links
 Khairil Anwar at Soccerway
 Khairil Anwar at Liga Indonesia

1997 births
Living people
Indonesian footballers
Persiraja Banda Aceh players
Association football midfielders
Sportspeople from Aceh